Vilimoni Botitu (born 15 Jun 1998) is a Fiji national rugby sevens team player and Castres in French top 14.  Botitu made his debut for Fiji on the World Rugby Sevens Series in the 2018 Dubai Sevens Tournament.   He played as inside centre in the Fiji national under-20 rugby union team that won the 2018 World Rugby Under 20 Championship.  Botitu has been a standout player for the during the 2018-2019 Sevens Series.

Awards 

 Player of the Final, Cape Town Sevens 2018
 Hamilton Sevens 2019 Dream Team
 Dream team Singapore Sevens 2019

References

External links

Living people
1998 births
Fiji international rugby sevens players
Rugby union centres
Place of birth missing (living people)
Rugby sevens players at the 2020 Summer Olympics
Medalists at the 2020 Summer Olympics
Olympic gold medalists for Fiji
Olympic medalists in rugby sevens
Olympic rugby sevens players of Fiji